The Northeastern women's ice hockey team represents Northeastern University. The Huskies play in the Hockey East conference.

History
The women's varsity hockey program started in 1980, and under Don MacLeod, who was named the coach the following season and led the program for ten season. Northeastern became the first national power in collegiate women's hockey under his direction. MacLeod was a former Massachusetts High School hockey coach at both Georgetown Junior-Senior High School and Saugus High School.  Starting in the 1982–83 season, the lady Huskies had thirteen consecutive winning seasons, including six straight seasons of twenty or more wins between 1986–87 and 1991–92.

The program's best record was in 1987–88, when the undefeated squad finished 26–0–1, winning its first of three ECAC titles (the others coming in 1989 and 1997), at the time the effective national women's college championship.  Northeastern has also been the ECAC finalist seven times, as well as winning eighteen women's Beanpot tournaments, including nine straight between 1984 and 1991–92.  The Huskies' all-time best mark for wins was in 2022-23 with 34 so far.

The program's career scoring leader is Alina Müller, currently with 98 goals and 156 assists for 254 points, while Kendall Coyne is the career goals leader with 141. Coyne also holds the single season goal and points record with 50 goals and 84 points in the 2015-2016 season. The previous single-season goal and points leader was Vicky Sunohara, with 51 goals and 78 points in 1988-89.

From 2017-2023, the Huskies played in seven consecutive Hockey East championships, winning six in a row from 2018-2023. Alina Müller (2019–2020, 2021-2022, 2022-2023) and Aerin Frankel (2017-2018, 2018-2019, 2020-2021) won the tournament MVP honors. The Huskies set a record for most goals in a women's Hockey East championship game with their 9-1 win over the University of Connecticut Huskies in 2020.

Roster
As of September 9, 2022.

Year by year

Beanpot

The Northeastern women have historically found success in the Beanpot, winning 18 of 44 tournaments and compiling a 50-30-5 record through 2020. The Huskies appeared in 16 straight finals, from 1983 to 1998, winning 13 of those tournaments, including 9 straight. The Huskies have qualified for the Beanpot finals 28 times through 2023:
March 17, 1979: Northeastern 3, Boston College 1
February 24, 1980: Northeastern 7, Harvard 1
February 18, 1983: Northeastern 7, Harvard 1
February 17, 1984: Northeastern 7, Harvard 1
February 12, 1985: Northeastern 7, Boston College 0
February 11, 1986: Northeastern 7, Harvard 0
February 10, 1987: Northeastern 7, Harvard 1
February 9, 1988: Northeastern 5, Harvard 1
February 14, 1989: Northeastern 9, Harvard 0
February 13, 1990: Northeastern 3, Harvard 2
February 12, 1991: Northeastern 2, Harvard 1
February 11, 1992: Harvard 3, Northeastern 0
February 9, 1993: Brown 3, Northeastern 0
February 15, 1994: Northeastern 6, Harvard 2
February 14, 1995: Harvard 3, Northeastern 2
February 13, 1996: Northeastern 4, Boston College 3 (OT)
February 11, 1997: Northeastern 8, Harvard 1
February 10, 1998: Northeastern 5, Harvard 4
February 15, 2000: Harvard 4, Northeastern 3 (OT)
February 13, 2001: Harvard 4, Northeastern 3 (OT)
February 10, 2004, Harvard 5, Northeastern 1
February 9, 2010: Harvard 1, Northeastern 0
February 7, 2012: Northeastern 4, Boston University 3 (OT)
February 12, 2013: Northeastern 4, Boston College 3
February 11, 2014: Boston College 3, Northeastern 0 
February 9, 2016: Boston College 7, Northeastern 0
February 7, 2017: Boston College 2, Northeastern 1 
February 11, 2020: Northeastern 4, Boston University 3 (2-OT)
2021- Cancelled due to the Coronavirus Pandemic
February 14, 2023: Northeastern 2, Boston College 1

Notable alums
Among notable players for Northeastern have been former Canadian national team captain Vicky Sunohara, United States national team goaltender Kelly Dyer who was also notably the second woman to play professional ice hockey in North America, United States national team goaltender Chanda Gunn, ten-time United States national team member Shelley Looney, 2002 collegiate women's player of the year Brooke Whitney, and long time Canadian national team member and Olympic medalist Laura Schuler. Chelsey Goldberg is now a professional ice hockey player.

In addition, the following Huskies have played on the United States national team:  Tina Cardinale (1990, 1992), Kendall Coyne (2010–12), Kim Haman (1992), Erika Silva (2004), Jeanine Sobek (1990, 1992, 1994–96), Brooke White (2001, 2004), Hillary Witt (2001). Additionally, Florence Schelling was the goaltender of the Switzerland national team (2004-2018).

Hilary Witt

Witt came to Northeastern University in 1996 from Canton High School in Canton, Massachusetts. In hockey she played on the Assabet Valley Club team for four years while they won two National Championships. In her freshman year, she helped the Huskies to a 27-9 season and the 1997 ECAC Championship. Witt scored two goals, including the game winner, in the 3–2 title win over New Hampshire and as a rookie was named the tournament MVP. She led the team in scoring that season with 24 goals.

In Witt's sophomore season she led the team in scoring once again with 32 goals, and her 58 points (ranked in the nation's top 10). She was a nominee for the Patty Kazmaier Award. She was also voted All-ECAC. The team went 26-6-5 and qualified for the ECAC Tournament and the semifinals of the first ever women's hockey National Championship.

As a junior, Witt led NU with 27 goals, and was in the nation's top 10 in scoring. Once again, she was a Kazmaier nominee. The team went 25-7-3 and went on to the ECAC Tournament. Witt captained Northeastern's 1999–2000 team to a 22-9-3 season and another post-season appearance. She led NU in scoring with 30 goals for the fourth consecutive year. In terms of scoring, was in the nation's top 10, and was voted All-ECAC. Also, for the third year in a row she was a Kazmaier candidate. On February 10, 2010, she was inducted into the Women's Beanpot Hall of Fame. The induction honors her performance as a player for Northeastern in the annual tournament featuring the four Boston-area women's hockey teams. The ceremony was held prior to the Beanpot Championship game at Harvard's Bright Center.

Olympians

Awards and honors
 Skylar Fontaine, Northeastern, 2021 Hockey East Best Defenseman Award
Aerin Frankel, Northeastern, 2021 Hockey East PNC Bank Three Stars Award
Alina Müller, Northeastern, 2021 Hockey East Scoring Champion (31 points), 2023 Hockey East Scoring Champion (40 points)

Patty Kazmaier Award
Brooke Whitney (2001–02)
Kendall Coyne (2015–16)
Aerin Frankel (2020–21)
 
Women's Hockey Commissioners Association National Goalie of the Year
Aerin Frankel (2020–21), (2021–22)
Gwyneth Philips (2022–23)

Division I All-American
First Team
Kendall Coyne (2015–16)
Skylar Fontaine (2020–21, 2021–22)
Aerin Frankel (2019–20, 2020–21, 2021–22)
Chanda Gunn (2003–04)
Alina Müller (2019–20, 2021–21, 2022–23)
Gwyneth Philips (2022–23)
Florence Schelling (2011–12)
Erika Silva (2000–01)
Brooke Whitney (2001–02)
Second Team
Chloe Aurard (2020–21)
Kendall Coyne (2012–13, 2014–15)
Skylar Fontaine (2018–19, 2019–20)
Kim Greene (2001–02)
Chanda Gunn (2001–02)
Alina Müller (2018–19, 2021–22)
Maureen Murphy (2021–22)
Florence Schelling (2009–10)
Jaime Totten (1998–99)
Brooke Whitney (2000–01)

Humanitarian Award
Missy Elumba (2008–09)
Chanda Gunn (2003–04)

NCAA Sportsmanship Award
Chanda Gunn (2003–04)

NCAA Today's Top 10 Award
Kendall Coyne (2017)

Honda Inspiration Award
Chanda Gunn (2003–04)

AHCA Coach of the Year
Dave Flint (2021, 2023)

Conference Coach of the Year
Dave Flint (2012, 2019, 2020, 2021, 2023)
Joey Woog (2003-04)

Conference Player of the Year
Kendall Coyne (HEA: 2015–16)
Aerin Frankel (HEA: 2020–21 Co-POY)
Chanda Gunn (HEA: 2003-04)
Shelley Looney (ECAC: 1993-94)
Alina Müller (HEA: 2019–20, 2020–21 Co-POY, 2022–23)
Florence Schelling (HEA: 2009-10, 2011–12)
Brooke Whitney (ECAC Eastern: 2001-02)

Conference Rookie of the Year
Alina Müller (HEA: 2018-19)
Kendall Coyne (HEA: 2011-12)
Vicky Sunohara (ECAC: 1988-89)

Conference Goalie of the Year
Gwyneth Philips (HEA: 2022–23)
Aerin Frankel (HEA: 2018-19, 2019–20, 2020–21, 2021–22)
Florence Schelling (HEA: 2011-12)
Chanda Gunn (HEA: 2003-04)
Erika Silva (ECAC: 2000-01)

Conference Defenseman of the Year
Megan Carter (2022–23)
Skylar Fontaine (2019–20, 2020–21, 2021–22)

Bauer Goaltending Champion
Florence Schelling (2009–10, 2011–12)

Conference Tournament MVP
Alina Müller (HEA: 2020, 2023)
Aerin Frankel (HEA: 2018, 2019, 2021)
Chanda Gunn (ECAC Eastern: 2002)
Hilary Witt (ECAC: 1997)
Shelley Looney (ECAC: 1993)

"Three-Stars" Award
Kendall Coyne (2012–13)
Aerin Frankel (2020–21)
Chanda Gunn (2003–04)
Florence Schelling (2011–12)
Leah Sulyma (2007–08)

All-Hockey East
First Team
Chloe Aurard (2019–20)
McKenna Brand (2016-17)
Megan Carter (2022–23)
Kendall Coyne (2011–12, 2012–13, 2014-15, 2015-16)
Skylar Fontaine (2018-19, 2019–20, 2020–21, 2021–22)
Aerin Frankel (2018-19, 2019–20, 2020–21, 2021–22)
Chanda Gunn (2003–04)
Heather Mottau (2014-15)
Alina Müller (2018-19, 2019–20, 2020–21, 2022–23)
Maureen Murphy (2021–22)
Gwyneth Philips (2022–23)
Florence Schelling (2009–10, 2011–12)

Second Team
Chloe Aurard (2021–22, 2022-23)
Brittany Bugalski (2015-16)
Lori DiGiacomo (2004–05)
Chanda Gunn (2002–03)
Theresa Ella (2003–04)
Brittany Esposito (2013-14)
Amy Goodney (2003–04)
Stephanie Gavronsky (2011–12)
Brooke Hobson (2018-19, 2020–21, 2021-22)
Lauren Kelly (2017-18)
Jordan Krause (2015-16)
Denisa Krizova (2015-16, 2016-17)
Heather Mottau (2016-17)
Alina Müller (2021–22)
Maureen Murphy (2022–23)
Casey Pickett (2011–12, 2012–13)

Third Team
Kasidy Anderson (2018–19)
Brooke Hobson (2019–20)
Katy Knoll (2019–20, 2022-23)
Abbey Marohn (2022-23)
Maureen Murphy (2020–21)

Honorable Mention
Megan Carter (2021-22)
Veronika Pettey (2018-19)
Heather Mottau (2014-15, 2015-16)
Colleen Murphy (2013-14)
Katie MacSorley (2013-14)
Chelsey Goldberg (2012-2013, 2014-15)
Chloe Desjardins (2012-13)
Maggie DiMasi (2012-13)
Rachel Llanes (2010-11)
Kristi Kehoe (2008-09)
Julia Marty (2008-09)
Chelsey Jones (2006-07)
Marisa Hourihan (2004-05, 2005-06)
Nikki Petrich (2005-06)
Amy Goodney (2004-05)
Cydny Kenyon (2003-04)
Brooke White (2002-03)
Kim Greene (2002-03)

All-ECAC Eastern
First Team
Kim Greene (2001–02)
Brooke White (2001–02)
Brooke Whitney (2001–02)
Second Team
Chanda Gunn (2001–02)

All-ECAC
First Team
Michelle DiStefano (1993–94)
Shelley Looney (1993–94)
Erika Silva (2000–01)
Jeanine Sobek (1993–94)
Jaime Totten (1997–98)
Brooke Whitney (2000–01)
Second Team
Hilary Witt (1997–98, 1999-00)
Jaime Totten (1998–99)

HCA Awards
Aerin Frankel, WHCA National Goaltender of the Month, November 2019
Aerin Frankel, WHCA National Goaltender of the Month, January 2021 
Aerin Frankel, WHCA National Goaltender of the Month, February 2021 

Aerin Frankel, Hockey Commissioners Association Women’s Goaltender of the Month (March 2021) 
Aerin Frankel, WHCA Goalie of the Year 2021

Katy Knoll, Women’s Hockey Commissioners’ Association National Rookie of the Month, November 2019

Alina Müller, Hockey Commissioners Association Women’s Player of the Month (February 2021)

Beanpot Awards
Most Valuable Player award
1979 Diane DerBogoshian 
1980 Diane Sorrenti 
1984 Stephanie Kelly 
1985 Tracy Hill 
1986 Nina Koyama 
1987 Fiona Rice 
1988 Tina Cardinale 
1989 Vicky Sunohara   
1990 Julie Piacentini  
1991 Sue Guay
1993 Kim Haman 
1994 Shelley Looney  
1996 Jessica Wagner   
1997 Stephanie Acres   
1998 Lisa Giovanelli 
2012 Casey Pickett
2013 Kendall Coyne
2020 Chloe Aurard
2023 Maureen Murphy
Bertagna Award (top goalie) 
2000 Erika Silva  
2001 Erika Silva 
2012 Florence Schelling
2013 Chloe Desjardins 
2020 Aerin Frankel
2023 Gwyneth Philips

Hall of Fame
Diane DerBoghosian (Inducted in 2008)
Kelly Dyer Hayes (Inducted in 2013)
Don MacLeod (Head Coach) (Inducted in 2012)
Julie Pacientini (Inducted in 2009)
Kathryn Waldo (Inducted in 2011)
Hilary Witt (Inducted in 2010)

Northeastern Hall of Fame
Tina Cardinale (2002)
Kelly Dyer (1995)
Chanda Gunn (2012) 
Shelley Looney (1999)
Donna-Lynn Rosa (2009)
Laura Schuler (2004)
Carolyn Sullivan (2011)
Brooke Whitney (2008)
Hilary Witt (2005)

Huskies in professional hockey

See also
Northeastern Huskies men's ice hockey
Northeastern Huskies

References

External links
 Northeastern University women's ice hockey

 
Ice hockey teams in Boston
1980 establishments in Massachusetts
Ice hockey clubs established in 1980